Mousumi Saha is an Indian actress. She acts in films of many languages. She also starred in 58 episodes of the Star Jalsha serial Khokababu, airing from 2017 as "Kaushalya Mukherjee".

Filmography

Television
Sindoorkhela (2010-2012)
Khokababu (2016-2018) 
Deep Jwele Jaai (2015-2017)
Bidhir Bidhan (2012-2013)
Dhonni Meye (2009-2011)
Bikele Bhorer Phool(2017)
Guriya Jekhane Guddu Sekhane(2018–2020)
Durga Durgeshwari (2019-2020)
Kopalkundola(2019-2020)
Khelaghor (2020-present)
Gangaram (2020-Present)
Gouri Elo (2022-Present)

References

Indian television actresses
Bengali actresses
Indian film actresses
Actresses in Bengali cinema
Bengali television actresses
Year of birth missing (living people)
Living people